The nominations for the 16th Vancouver Film Critics Circle Awards, honoring the best in filmmaking in 2015, were announced on December 14, 2015. Several winners were announced on December 21, 2015, while the rest were revealed on January 6, 2016.

Winners and nominees

International

Best Film
 Spotlight
 Mad Max: Fury Road
 The Revenant

Best Director
 George Miller – Mad Max: Fury Road
 Todd Haynes – Carol
 Alejandro G. Iñárritu – The Revenant

Best Actor
 Michael Fassbender – Steve Jobs
 Leonardo DiCaprio – The Revenant
 Eddie Redmayne – The Danish Girl

Best Actress
 Brie Larson – Room
 Cate Blanchett – Carol
 Saoirse Ronan – Brooklyn

Best Supporting Actor
 Mark Rylance – Bridge of Spies
 Michael Shannon – 99 Homes
 Sylvester Stallone – Creed

Best Supporting Actress
 Alicia Vikander – Ex Machina
 Jennifer Jason Leigh – The Hateful Eight
 Alicia Vikander – The Danish Girl

Best Screenplay
 Charlie Kaufman – Anomalisa
 Emma Donoghue – Room
 Tom McCarthy and Josh Singer – Spotlight

Best Foreign-Language Film
 The Assassin
 Goodnight Mommy
 Son of Saul

Best Documentary
 Amy
 Cartel Land
 Going Clear: Scientology and the Prison of Belief

Canadian

Best Canadian Film
 Room
 The Forbidden Room
 Sleeping Giant

Best Director of a Canadian Film
 Andrew Cividino – Sleeping Giant
 Lenny Abrahamson – Room
 Atom Egoyan – Remember

Best Actor in Canadian Film
 Jacob Tremblay – Room
 Michael Eklund – Eadweard
 Christopher Plummer – Remember

Best Actress in Canadian Film
 Brie Larson – Room
 Marie Brassard – The Heart of Madame Sabali
 Julia Sarah Stone – Wet Bum

Best Supporting Actor in Canadian Film
 Nick Serino – Sleeping Giant
 Patrick Huard – My Internship in Canada
 Reece Moffett – Sleeping Giant

Best Supporting Actress in Canadian Film
 Tara Pratt – No Men Beyond This Point
 Joan Allen – Room
 Suzanne Clement – My Internship in Canada

Best Screenplay of a Canadian Film
 Emma Donoghue – Room
 Benjamin August – Remember
 Andrew Cividino, Blain Watters, and Aaron Yeger – Sleeping Giant

Best Canadian Documentary
 Haida Gwaii: On the Edge of the World
 Fractured Land
 How to Change the World
 Hurt

Best First Film by a Canadian Director
 Sleeping Giant
 Hit 2 Pass
 Wet Bum

Best British Columbia Film
 Haida Gwaii: On the Edge of the World
 Eadweard
 No Men Beyond This Point

References

External links
 

2015
2015 film awards
2015 in Canadian cinema
2015 in British Columbia